Family Affair is a 1966–1971 American sitcom starring Brian Keith and Sebastian Cabot.

Family Affair(s) or A Family Affair may also refer to:

Television

Series 
 A Family Affair (TV series), a 2022 Filipino drama series created by ABS-CBN
 Family Affair (2002 TV series), a remake of the 1966 series which aired on the WB
 Family Affairs (1949 TV serial), a BBC serial
 Family Affairs (1959 TV programme), a BBC discussion programme
 Family Affairs, a 1997–2005 British soap opera

Episodes 
 "Family Affair" (American Dad!), 2009
 "Family Affair" (CSI), 2009
 "Family Affair" (The Following), 2014
 "Family Affair" (The Golden Girls), 1986
 "Family Affair" (Grey's Anatomy), 2016
 "Family Affair" (Three's a Crowd), 1984
 "Family/Affair", an episode of Ugly Betty, 2001
 "A Family Affair" (The Colbys), 1986
 "A Family Affair" (Get a Life), 1990
 "A Family Affair" (Silver Spoons), 1986

Film
 A Family Affair (1920 film), a Krazy Kat animated film
 A Family Affair (1937 film), an American film, the first in the Andy Hardy series
 A Family Affair (1984 film), a Hong Kong comedy-drama film
 A Family Affair (2001 film), an LGBT-related film
 Family Affair (film), a 2010 American documentary by Chico Colvard
 A Family Affair (2023 film), an upcoming American romantic comedy

Books 
 Family Affairs (novel), a 1950 novel by Cecil Street
 A Family Affair (novel), a 1975 Nero Wolfe novel by Rex Stout
 Family Affair, a 2009 novel by Caprice Crane

Music

Albums
 Family Affair (The Bear Quartet album), 1993
 Family Affair (MC Hammer album), 1998
 Family Affair (Philip Bailey album), 1989
 A Family Affair (Christian McBride album), 1998
 A Family Affair (Mikael Bolyos album), 2007

Songs
 "Family Affair" (Mary J. Blige song), 2001
 "Family Affair" (Sly and the Family Stone song), 1971

Other
 A Family Affair (musical), a 1962 Broadway musical

See also